Beatrice Colin (14 October 1963 – 6 February 2019) was a British novelist, radio dramatist, and senior lecturer in creative writing at the University of Strathclyde.

Early life
Beatrice Colin was born in London on 14 October 1963. Her family moved to Lancashire and then to Glasgow, where she attended Dumbarton Academy and Park School for Girls, followed by the University of Glasgow in 1982, where she read English. There she formed the musical duo April Showers with Jonathan Bernstein – their single Abandon Ship reached 144 in the UK singles charts.

Career
After graduating from the University of Glasgow, she worked as a journalist for the arts and features pages of publications including The Scotsman, Sunday Herald and The Guardian.

In her late twenties, she won a Radio 4 short story competition and started writing radio plays and adaptations.

She completed her PhD in creative writing at the University of Strathclyde in 2008.

Novels
 Nude, Untitled, 2001— shortlisted for the Saltire First Book Award
 Disappearing Act, 2002
 The Luminous Life of Lilly Aphrodite (UK title), 2008The Glimmer Palace (US title), 2007 — Recommended by the Richard & Judy Book Club, 2009
 The Songwriter, 2010 New York 1916, 2011 (Italian translation)
 To Capture What We Cannot Keep, 2016  
 The Glass House, 2020

Short stories
 The Suffragette’s Party
 Toad
 Grey Evening

For children
 My Invisible Sister with Sara Pinto, 2010 (made into the film Invisible Sister by Disney TV)
 Pyrate’s Boy, 2013 (as E B Colin)

Radio plays

Theatre

Film
 Invisible Sister, 2015 Disney Channel Original Movie based on the book My Invisible Sister
 The Hide, 2017 short film

Personal life
Beatrice Colin married Ewan Morrison in 1996; the couple had two children, Theo in 1998 and Frances in 2001. Their marriage ended in 2003.

She met Paul Harkin, a lecturer, in 2008; they married in 2016. 

She was diagnosed with ovarian cancer in 2016, from which she died in 2019 aged 55.

References

External links
 Beatrice Colin’s website

 Beatrice Colin at Fantastic Fiction
 Beatrice Colin at Goodreads
  Beatrice Colin at Royal Literary Fund

1963 births
2019 deaths
21st-century British novelists
Alumni of the University of Glasgow
Alumni of the University of Strathclyde
British radio writers
British women dramatists and playwrights
British women novelists
Deaths from ovarian cancer
People educated at Dumbarton Academy
Women radio writers